In law, comity is "a practice among different political entities (as countries, states, or courts of different jurisdictions)" involving the "mutual recognition of legislative, executive, and judicial acts."

Etymology
Comity derives from the Latin comitas, courtesy, from cemis, friendly, courteous.

International law

The doctrine of international comity has been described variously "as a choice-of-law principle, a synonym for private international law, a rule of public international law, a moral obligation, expediency, courtesy, reciprocity, utility, or diplomacy. Authorities disagree as to whether comity is a rule of natural law, custom, treaty, or domestic law. Indeed, there is not even agreement that comity is a rule of law at all." Because the doctrine touches on many different principles, it is regarded as "one of the more confusing doctrines evoked in cases touching upon the interests of foreign states."

The doctrine of international comity was created by a group of Dutch jurists in the late seventeenth century, most prominently Ulrich Huber. Huber and others sought a way to handle conflicts of law in a way that would reinforce the idea of Westphalian sovereignty. Huber wrote that comitas gentium ("civility of nations") required the application of foreign law in certain cases because sovereigns "so act by way of comity that rights acquired within the limits of a government retain their force everywhere so far as they do not cause prejudice to the powers or rights of such government or of their subjects." Huber  "believed that comity was a principle of international law" but also that "the decision to apply foreign law itself was left up to the state as an act of free will."

The idea of comity was introduced into English law by Lord Mansfield, a British barrister and jurist. Mansfield viewed the application of comity as discretionary, with courts applying foreign law "except to the extent that it conflicted with principles of natural justice or public policy." Mansfield held in Somerset v Stewart (King's Bench 1772), for example, that slavery was so morally odious that a British court would not recognize the property rights of an American slaveholder in his slave.

In the United States, Louisiana attorney Samuel Livermore (who wrote the first American treatise of conflict of laws in 1828) expressly rejected the comity doctrine as formulated by Mansfield and earlier writers, instead arguing that "courts were bound by international law to apply the same law that a foreign court would apply." This idea was rejected by Justice Joseph Story of the Supreme Court, who agreed with Mansfield and Huber in his Commentaries on the Conflict of Laws. Story's view, which ultimately prevailed, was that the consensual or voluntary application of comity doctrine would foster trust among states, "localize the effect of slavery," and reduce the risk of civil war.

The U.S. Supreme Court's holding in Hilton v. Guyot (1895) that the enforcement of a foreign judgment was a matter of comity is viewed as the "classic" statement of comity in international law. The Court held in that case:

In the United States, certain foreign defamation judgments are not recognized under the SPEECH Act (a federal statute enacted in 2010), which supersedes the comity doctrine. The Act aims to stop "libel tourism."

United States Constitution
In the law of the United States, the Comity Clause is another term for the Privileges and Immunities Clause of the Article Four of the United States Constitution, which provides that "The Citizens of each State shall be entitled to all Privileges and Immunities of Citizens in the several States." Article Four as a whole—which includes the Privileges and Immunities Clause, the Extradition Clause, and the Full Faith and Credit Clause—has been described as the "interstate comity" article of the Constitution.

Professional licensure
In the United States, some states and territories recognize professional engineer licenses granted in a different jurisdiction, depending on the holder's education and experience (a practice called "licensure by comity"). Rules differ significantly from jurisdiction to jurisdiction.

See also
Act of state doctrine
Alien Tort Statute
Forum non conveniens
Lex loci
Hartford Fire Insurance Co. v. California
Sovereign immunity
Universal jurisdiction

References

Conflict of laws
International law
International law legal terminology
American legal terminology